Taxation in Puerto Rico consists of taxes paid to the United States federal government and taxes paid to the Government of the Commonwealth of Puerto Rico. Payment of taxes to the federal government, both personal and corporate, is done through the federal Internal Revenue Service (IRS), while payment of taxes to the Commonwealth government is done through the Puerto Rico Department of Treasury.

Puerto Rico is an unincorporated territory of the United States and Puerto Ricans are U.S. citizens; however, Puerto Rico is not a U.S. state, but a U.S. insular area. Consequently, while all Puerto Rico residents pay federal taxes, many residents are not required to pay federal income taxes. Aside from income tax, U.S. federal taxes include customs taxes, federal commodity taxes, and federal payroll taxes (Social Security, Medicare, and Unemployment taxes). 

Not all Puerto Rican employees and corporations pay federal income taxes. Federal law requires payment of federal income tax from the following residents and corporations only: federal government employees in Puerto Rico, residents who are members of the United States military, those with income sources outside of Puerto Rico, those individuals or corporations who do business with the federal government, and those Puerto Rico-based corporations that intend to send funds to the United States.

Federal taxes
Residents of Puerto Rico are required to pay most types of federal taxes. Specifically, residents of Puerto Rico pay customs taxes, Federal commodity taxes, and all payroll taxes (also known as FICA taxes, which include (a) Social Security, (b) Medicare, and Unemployment taxes).

Federal income taxes
Some Puerto Rico residents pay U.S. federal income taxes. Residents falling within the following categories must pay tax on their income to the United States federal government, via the Internal Revenue Service:

Puerto Rico residents who:
 work for the federal government such as US Post Office employees, and federal agents of any of the federal executive and judicial branches located in Puerto Rico 
  do business with the federal government
 are members of the U.S. military
 earned income from sources outside Puerto Rico and
 Puerto Rico-based corporations that intend to send funds to the U.S.

However, notwithstanding these requirements, some residents of Puerto Rico are not required to file federal income tax returns because their income falls below the poverty threshold. As of 2019, the median income of Puerto Rico was $20,166, which falls below the poverty threshold of $24,400. The IRS does not require individuals or households below the poverty threshold to pay federal income tax.

Puerto Rico residents pay more in federal income taxes every year than do residents of six U.S. states: "From 1998 up until 2006, when Puerto Rico was hit by its present economic recession, Puerto  Rico consistently contributed more than $4 billion annually in federal taxes and impositions into the national fisc." This was more that the IRS collected from taxpayers in six States of the Union: Vermont, Wyoming, South Dakota, North Dakota, Montana, and Alaska, as well as the Northern Mariana Islands.  

As the cutoff point for income taxation in Puerto Rico is lower than that imposed by the U.S. IRS code and because the per-capita income in Puerto Rico is much lower than the average per-capita income of the US states, more Puerto Rico residents pay income taxes to the local taxation authority than if the IRS code were applied to the island. This occurs because "the Commonwealth of Puerto Rico government has a wider set of [fiscal] responsibilities than do U.S. State and local governments." As a result, the Commonwealth government imposes a separate income tax to make up for revenue funds that would otherwise be available through state-like funding resulting from federal income tax.

Only certain residents of Puerto Rico are required to file federal income tax returns. According to the Internal Revenue Service:

Other US Federal taxes
While the Commonwealth government has its own tax laws, Puerto Rico residents are also required to pay US federal taxes, but most residents do not have to pay the federal personal income tax. 

Employers in Puerto Rico are subject to both Federal Insurance Contributions Act (FICA) tax (a payroll withholding tax, which funds Social Security and Medicare) and the Federal Unemployment Tax Act (FUTA). Employers in Puerto Rico must withhold the employee portion of FICA taxes from their employees' wages and contribute the employer portion of FICA.

In 2016, Puerto Rico paid close to  into the US Treasury in the form of Business Income Taxes, Individual income tax withheld and FICA tax, Individual income tax payments and SECA tax, Unemployment insurance tax, Estate and trust income tax, Estate tax, Gift tax and Excise taxes.

Social Security and Supplemental Security Income (SSI) benefits
In general, "many federal social welfare programs have been extended to Puerto Ric[o] residents, but usually with caps inferior to those allocated to the states." 

Residents of Puerto Rico who have paid into Social Security are eligible for benefits upon retirement. Residents of Puerto Rico who have paid into Social Security however are excluded from receiving Supplemental Security Income (SSI) benefits would they otherwise qualify. Commonwealth of Puerto Rico residents, unlike residents of the Commonwealth of the Northern Mariana Islands and residents of the 50 States, currently do not qualify for SSI. (SSI benefits are generally for low-income, disabled, as well as for elderly.) On 10 April 2020, the U.S. Court of Appeals for the First Circuit ruled that residents of Puerto Rico were eligible for SSI benefits, finding that residents of Puerto Rico make substantial contributions to the federal treasury in higher amounts than taxpayers in at least six states and the territory of the Northern Mariana Islands. In March 2021, the US Supreme Court agreed to look at the constitutionality of the SSI issue.

Medicaid and Medicare benefits
Puerto Rico receives less than 15% of the Medicaid funding it would receive were it a state and Medicare providers receive less-than-full state-like reimbursements for services rendered to beneficiaries in Puerto Rico even though the latter paid fully into the system.

Commonwealth taxes

The main body of domestic statutory tax law in Puerto Rico is the Código de Rentas Internas de Puerto Rico (Internal Revenue Code of Puerto Rico). The code organizes commonwealth laws covering commonwealth income tax, payroll taxes, gift taxes, estate taxes and statutory excise taxes. All federal employees, those who do business with the federal government, Puerto Rico-based corporations that intend to send funds to the US, and some others also pay federal income taxes (for example, Puerto Rico residents who earned income from sources outside Puerto Rico. In addition, because the cutoff point for income taxation is lower than that of the US IRS code and because the per-capita income in Puerto Rico is much lower than the average per-capita income on the U.S. mainland, more Puerto Rico residents pay income taxes to the local taxation authority than if the IRS code were applied to the island. That occurs because "the Commonwealth of Puerto Rico government has a wider set of [fiscal] responsibilities than do U.S. State and local governments."

Property Tax
Property taxes are the main fund of the 78 municipalities of Puerto Rico.

Sales and Use Tax
The Puerto Rico Sales and Use Tax (SUT, IVU) is the combined sales and use tax applied to most sales in Puerto Rico. As of 2020, the tax rate is 11.5%: 1.0% of the tax collected goes to the municipality where the sale was executed (there are 78  - municipalities), and 10.5% of the tax collected goes to Government of Puerto Rico ("state" level). Furthermore, half of the portion that belongs to the state government is destined to the Urgent Interest Fund Corporation (COFINA) to pay the public debt of Puerto Rico, making it a three-tier tax.

In July 2006, the government approved Law Number 117, The 2006 Contributive Justice Law, which established a tax with a 5.5% rate at state level and an optional 1.5% rate at municipal level. The tax went into effect on November 15, 2006. The tax is better known as the Sales and Use Tax''' (Impuesto sobre Ventas y Uso''), often referred to by its Spanish acronym "IVU". The law amended Article B of the Code and created sub-article BB. On 29 July 2007, the government approved Law Number 80, making the tax mandatory for all municipalities of the commonwealth. Also, the tax rates were changed to 6% at the state level and 1% at the municipal level.

On 1 July 2015, the sales tax rate was increased from 7% to 11.5%, in response to a suffering economy. The new tax contributes 1% to the municipality level and 10.5% to the "state" level. The IVU was scheduled to expire on 1 April 2016, to be replaced with a value-added tax (VAT) of 10.5% for the state level, with the 1% IVU continuing for the municipalities.  On 2 May 2016 the House of Representatives voted to repeal the adoption of value added tax (VAT), followed shortly by the Senate on 5 May 2016. The Legislature decided to continue the existing Sales and Use Taxation (SUT) system.

Import / Export Taxes
A common misconception is that customs taxes (also called import/export taxes) collected by the U.S. government on products manufactured in Puerto Rico are all returned to the Puerto Rico Treasury. That is not the case, and such taxes are returned to the Puerto Rico Treasury only for rum products. Even then, the US Treasury keeps a portion of the taxes.

See also

Federal voting rights in Puerto Rico
Jones–Shafroth Act
Law of Puerto Rico
Legal profession in Puerto Rico
No taxation without representation
Puerto Rican citizenship
Puerto Ricans in the United States

Notes

References

Further reading

External links
IRS Topic No. 901.
IRS pub. 1321.
 1996 Report by GAO, see pages 29-43, Appendix II Comparison of U.S. and Puerto Rico Individual Income Tax Rules
 Departamento de Hacienda de Puerto Rico

 
Department of Treasury of Puerto Rico
Economy of Puerto Rico
Finance in Puerto Rico
Government of Puerto Rico
Puerto Rican law